Amukta Ani (English: Two In One) is a 2014 Indian Meitei language film directed by Romi Meitei and produced by Jenny Khurai. It stars Bala Hijam, Roshan Pheiroijam and Sushmita Mangsatabam in the lead roles. The story of the film was written by Laishram Santosh and Thoi, and screenplay by Romi Meitei and Laishram Santosh.

The film was released at Bhagyachandra Open Air Theatre (BOAT) on 11 October 2014 with a red-carpet event hosted by WOL Media named as Khongul.

Synopsis
The movie is about a boy striving to earn a girl's love. Mangal is a spoilt child. Both Mangal and Thoibi study at the same school. Mangal meets Thoibi when he is fighting with the gatekeeper of the school. Since then, he follows her everywhere (including tuition centres). He even follows her to Delhi. It is a love triangle film, where Langlen comes in between Thoibi and Mangal, and the film shows how Thoibi takes all the responsibilities of misclosings and misunderstandings in the love triangle. The film also shows Thoibi and Langlen's contrasting personalities.

Cast
 Bala Hijam as Thoibi
 Roshan Pheiroijam as Mangal
 Sushmita Mangsatabam as Langlen
 Ithoi Oinam as Laisana
 Gurumayum Priyogopal as Thoibi's father
 Sagolsem Dhanamanjuri as Thoibi's mother
 Khonykar Khuraijam as Mangal's father
 Thoudam Ongbi Modhubala as Mangal's mother

Production
This movie is the third production of Ima Sana Chingjroibi Films, after producing Kamala-Gokul starrer Mamado Leisabido Angaobido and Shumang Leela remake of Pizza Hiktharaba Samji: Pizza. The shooting of the film was done in Manipur and New Delhi.

Reception
khonjel.org wrote, "Amukta Ani tries to show the dutiful Bala with a big heart, big enough to sacrifice her love. All the characters are presented in an extreme way. The movie begins to fall when it comes into climax. I think it is because of the extreme characters."

Soundtrack
Sorri Senjam composed the soundtrack for the film and Romi Meitei wrote the lyrics. The songs are titled Mensinba Ngamdraba and Musi Musi Ngalliba.

See also 
 List of Meitei-language films

References

External links

See also
 Romi Meitei

2010s Meitei-language films
2014 films